The Île Barbe is an island situated in the middle of the Saône, in the 9th arrondissement de Lyon, the quartier Saint-Rambert-l'Île-Barbe (a former-commune annexed in 1963). Its name comes from the Latin insula barbara, "Barbarians' Island", suggesting that it was one of the last locales to be occupied (two centuries after the banks of the Saône at the foot of the hill of Fourvière).

Geography

History 

An abbaye was founded on the island in the 5th century. This was the first monastic establishment in the Lyon region and one of the oldest in all of Gaul. Charlemagne gave it a beautiful library.

The monastery, pillaged several times – (in 676 and 725 by the Saracens, and in 937 by the Huns), adopted the Rule of Saint Benedict règle de saint Benoît in the 9th century and gradually was enriched.

In 816, Louis the Pious (Louis le Pieux) awarded to the monastery:
 the right to maintain at all time three boats upon the Saône, the Rhône and the Doubs exempt from taxes for passage;
 a decree of immunity and protection for the monastery confirmed by Charles the Bald Charles le Chauve in 861.

At the beginning of the 16th century, the abbey passed into the ownership  of the bénéfice of the Albon family famille d'Albon.

In 1549, the abbey was secularised and the monks became a college of canons chanoines (collégiale).

In 1562, it was looted and burned by Protestant troops troupes protestantes of the Baron des Adrets baron des Adrets.

The chapter of canons chapitre des chanoines finally was suppressed in 1741, and an establishment for aged or infirm priests was established, which was suppressed in its turn in 1783. At the Revolution, everything remaining on the island was sold and dispersed.

The first bridge 
In the 17th century, or in 1734, the architect Cotton constructed a wooden bridge which provided access to the Ile Barbe In 1827, a suspension bridge replaced it (it is the oldest in Lyon still in service). It is reached from the passerelle Masaryk and the passerelle Saint-Vincent), crossing the island at the level of its southern point and permitting the juncture of the left and right banks of the Saône, the villages of Saint-Rambert (today Lyon 9e) and of Caluire-et-Cuire. For more information about this suspension bridge one may consult the page here dedicated to Bridges of Lyon Ponts de Lyon. During the years 1870–1880, three well-reputed rowing clubs were located here: the Aviron Club de Lyon-Caluire, the Aviron Union Nautique de Lyon (6e club français) and the Cercle de l'Aviron de Lyon (5e club français).

List of abbots and church figures 
2??–??? : Dorothée
???–??? : Philetus
???–??? : Julien
???–??? : Christophe
???–??? : Antoine Ier
???–??? : Martin
???–??? : Aigobert
???–??? : Astorg Ier
???–??? : Maxime
???–??? : Ambroise
???–??? : Loup
???–??? : Maximin
???–??? : Bligigaire
???–??? : Vinfrid
???–??? : Rotfred
???–??? : Garland
???–??? : Licinius
???–??? : saint Benoît Ier
???–??? : Campion
???–??? : Alaric
???–??? : Bartholomée
???–??? : Argeric
???–861 : Herbert
861–8?? : Gundramnus
8??–8?? : Norbert
8??–8?? : Varengard
8??–876 : Garlarin
876–8?? : Léobon
8??–??? : Astorg II
???–??? : Étienne
???–??? : Elgedis
???–??? : Antoine II
???–??? : Halinand
???–??? : Romuald
???–??? : Eudes
???–971 : Cumanus
971–994 : Heldebert
994–1007 : Benoît II
1007–1008 : Bernard
1008–1055 : Garnier
1055–1070 : Humbert
1070–10?? : Ogier
10??–1096 : Clément
1096–1116 :  Guy Ier
1116–1128 : Girin Ier
1128–11?? : Josserand
11??–11?? : Hugues Ier
11??–11?? : Olderic
11??–1150 : Guillaume Ier
1150–1152 : Girin II
1152–11?? : Saturnin
11??–1168 : Vicard
1161 : Hugues de Tournon "Moine"
1168–1183 : Hugues II
1183–1198 : Guichard, abbé
1198–1200 : Gaucerand
1200–1222 : Guy II
1222–1224 : Bermond
1224–1243 : Guillaume II de Jarez
1243–1245 : Foulques
1245–1246 : Omer
1246–1250 : Pierre Ier
1349 : Zacharie de Talaru "Moine"
1250 : Hugues de Varennes "Moine & Cellerier"
1250–1261 : Geoffroy de Vertelay
1256 : Zacharie de Talaru "Moine"
1261 : Humbert de Vassailleu "Moine"
1261–1270 : Pierre II de Vertelay
1270–1296 : Girin III de Sartines
1272 : Aymon de Vaux "Prieur Claustral"
de 1284 à 1440 : Hugues, Jean, Pierre & Pierre puis Claude de Roncherol "Moines"
1284 : Robert de Ryon "Religieux"
1296–1322 : André de Marzé
1300 : Estienne de Vego "Moine"
1309 : Guigues de Roussillon "Moine"
1322–1329 : Béraud Ier de Mercœur
1329–1334 : Pons de Guizeu
1334–13?? : Raymond de Beaufort
13??–13?? : Béraud II de La Baume
13??–1345 : Galbald
1345–134? : Simon de Gillans
134?–1350 : Bégon de Brossan
1350–1354 : Jean Ier Pilus-Fortis de Rabastens
1354–1372 : Guillaume III de Landore
1372–1394 : Pierre III de Villette
1383 : Pierre de Verriere "Aumosnier"
1394–1400 : Jean II de Sonhetto
1400–1428 : Pierre IV de Thurey
1401 : Pierre de Verriere "Aumosnier"
1411 : Faucerand du Saix "Religieux"
1419 : Antoine de Salornay "Moine"
1421 : Faucerand du Saix "Religieux"
1421 : Jean Rostain "Moine"
1428–1436 : Aynard de Cordon
1436 : Durand Vert "Moine"
1436 : Berno de Vienne "Moine"
1436 : Durand Vignols "Religieux"
1436–1458 : Claude Ier de Sotizon
1451 : Antoine de Rochefort la Valette "Moine"
1452 : Jean de Vaugrigneuse "Moine"
1453 : Eustache de Vaugrigneuse "Moine"
1453 : Aynard de Villeneufve "Chantre"
1455 : Guillaume de la Sale "Moine"
1458–1485 : Edouard de Messey
1464 : André le Viste "Religieux"
1485-1488 : cardinal Charles de Bourbon
1488–1500 : Henri de Seylac
1500 : Philibert Rosset "Moine"
1507 : Guyllaume de Villeneufve "Moine"
1500–1515 : Antoine III d’Albon de Saint-André
1500 : Jacques de Sassenage "Religieux"
1505 : Guillaume de Semur "Religieux & Chamarier"
1515–1525 : Antoine IV d’Albon de Saint-Forgeul
1525–1562 : Antoine V d’Albon de Saint-Forgeul
1550 : Claude Sautreau "Moine & Chantre"
1551 : Fleury de Salemard "Religieux Cloistrier"
1551 : Louis Vallier "Moine"
1551 : Antoine de Vauselles "Moine"
1562–1599 : Pierre V d’Espignac
1599–1609 : Jean III de Châtillon
1606–1613 : Claude II de Nérestang
1616–1620 : Antoine VI de Nérestang
1620–1693 : Camille de Neufville de Villeroy
1630–1660 : Claude Le Laboureur, prévôt du chapitre
1693–1741 : Antoine VII de Thélis de Saint-Cyr de Valorges

Source : Gallia Christiana

Possessions of the abbey 
Partial list of possessions held in its own name or in-fief by the abbey:

Lyonnais 
 fief et terres de Pollet, près Villefranche ;
 château de Lignieux, à Saint-Jean-de-Thurigneux (1186–1665) ;
 château de Miribel, à Miribel;

Jarez 
 Celle Saint-Martin de Firminy (971)
 Église Saint-Pierre "in Amodo" (Saint-Chamond?) (971)
 Église de Tartaras (1168–1183 – c. 1225)
 Église de Saint-Romain-en-Jarez (1168–1183 – c. 1225)
 Église de Saint-Paul-en-Cornillon (1225)
 La chapelle de Grangent (1183)

 Église Saint-Julien de la Tour-en-Jarez (1183), dépendant de Saint-Rambert-sur-Loire (c. 1225)
 Église Saint-Martin de la Fouillouse (1183), dépendant de Saint-Rambert-sur-Loire (c. 1225)
 Église de Bouthéon (1183), dépendant de Saint-Rambert-sur-Loire (c. 1225)
 Église Saint-Clément du Chambon-Feugerolles (1183), dépendant de Saint-Martin de Firminy

 Église de Saint-Laurent-d'Agny, dépendant de Saint-Rambert-sur-Loire (c. 1225)
 Église de Thurins, dépendant de Saint-Rambert-sur-Loire (c. 1225)
 Église de Veauche, dépendant de Saint-Rambert-sur-Loire (c. 1225)
 Église de Saint-Héand, dépendant de Saint-Rambert-sur-Loire  (c. 1225)
 Église de Chevrières, dépendant de Saint-Rambert-sur-Loire (c. 1225)

Forez 
 L'église Saint-André de Occiaco (monastère de Saint-Rambert) (971), les églises Saint-Côme (971) et Saint-Damien (1183) jusqu'à Noailleux (971)

 La Celle-Saint-Martin en Forez et église Saint-Bonnet de Cléppé (971)
 Eglise Sainte-Marie de Cottance (971)
 Église Sainte-Marie-Madeleine du château de Saint-Germain-Laval (1183)
 Église Sainte-Foy-Saint-Sulpice (1183)

 Église de Magneux-Haute-Rive (1183)
 Église de Mizérieux (1183)
 Église de Marclopt (1183) dépendant de Saint-Rambert-sur-Loire (v. 1225)

 Église de Sainte-Agathe (Sainte-Agathe-la-Bouteresse?) (1183)
 Église de Civens (1183)
 Église de Châtelus (1183) dépendant de Saint-Rambert-sur-Loire (v. 1225)
 Église du Sury-le-Comtal (1183)
 Église de Saint-Romain-le-Vieux (Chazelles-sur-Lyon, aujourd'hui hameau "La Tour") (1183)
 Église de Chambles (1183), dépendant de Saint-Rambert-sur-Loire (v. 1225)

 Église de "Benerone" (Bonson) (1183), dépendant de Saint-Rambert-sur-Loire (v. 1225)

 Église de Saint-Just-sur-Loire (1183)
 Église Saint-Romain de Jonzieux (1183)
 Église de Saint-Bonnet-le-Château, dépendant de Saint-Rambert-sur-Loire (v. 1225)
 Sainte-Croix-en-Jarez (1280)
 Villa de Triols (Luriecq) (1283)

The Ile today 
In the 21st century, the abbey consists of nothing more than the Romanesque église romane Notre-Dame. Only the northern part of the Ile may be visited (about one-half of the island) which consists of old private homes and a few vestiges of religious buildings. One also may find a gastronomic restaurant, of the chain Relais & Châteaux, the « Auberge de l'Île ». Also intact are some remains of a lodging reconstructed in about 1840 as the château de Saint-Rambert-l'Ile-Barbe or château du Fresnes, also the château du Chastelard of the 15th century, reconstructed in the 16th century.

A dwelling place for several persons, posh and privileged, the Ile is reached by a 10-minute bus ride from the gare de Vaise (bus TCL 31 et 43 côté Lyon-St Rambert), and 15 minutes from the Place Bellecour (bus TCL 40 côté Caluire).

The Ile is composed of a public part – terrains for pétanque, a large lawn, a children's playground – and a private part reached via two roads, l'impasse Saint-Loup for reaching the Auberge and the chemin du Bas-Port leading to the Saône).
These two paths are not joined, the impasse Saint-Loup ends at the door to a private courtyard.

Access 
 Lignes de bus: 31, 40, 43
 Stations Vélo'v : Île Barbe

Notes and references

See also

Bibliography 
 Claude Le Laboureur, Les masures de l'abbaye royale de l'isle Barbe lez Lyon, Lyon, 1665 disponible sur Google Books, rééd.par M.-C. et G. Guigue, Lyon, 1887–1895.
 Bésian Arroy, Brève et dévote histoire de l'abbaye de l'Isle Barbe, Lyon, 1668.
 L. Niepce, L'île-Barbe. son ancienne abbaye et le bourg de Saint-Rambert, Lyon, 1890
 M.M. Bouquet, L'abbaye de l'Ile-Barbe, des origines à la sécularisation, dans Positions de thèses de l'École des Chartes, Paris, 1938, pp. 13–21
 J. Picot, La seigneurie de l'abbaye de l'Ile-Barbe, Lyon, 1953
 J. Picot, Ile-Barbe, DHGE, XXV, 1995, c. 811–817
 J.-F. Reynaud, Le monastère de l'Ile-Barbe et le bourd de Saint-Rambert dans Saint-Rambert, un culte régional depuis l'époque mérovingienne. Histoire et archéologie., Paris, 1995, pp. 49–60
 Michel Rubellin, Église et société chrétienne d'Agobard à Valdès, PUL, 2003, Lyon, pp. 265–275.
 Robert Favreau, Un tympan roman à l'Île-Barbe près de Lyon, dans le Comptes-rendus des séances de l'Académie des Inscriptions et Belles-Lettres, 2005, Vol. 149,  n° 3, pp. 1007–1025
 Mémoire de pierres : Abbaye de l'Ile-Barbe, Lyon, 1995, Musée historique de Lyon, catalogue d'exposition Septembre 1995 - Janvier 1996,

External links 
 Historique de l'île Barbe jusqu'à nos jours
 les dimanches de l'île Barbe, festival estival de musique

Ile Barbe
River islands of France